The 1992 ATP Tour World Championships (also known as the IBM ATP Tour World Championships for sponsorship reasons) was a men's tennis tournament held in Frankfurt, Germany from 16 November until 20 November 1992. It was the 23rd edition of the tournament. Seventh-seeded Boris Becker won the singles title. The doubles event was held in Johannesburg

Finals

Singles

 Boris Becker defeated  Jim Courier, 6–4, 6–3, 7–5

Doubles

 Todd Woodbridge /  Mark Woodforde defeated  John Fitzgerald /  Anders Järryd 6–2, 7–6(7–4), 5–7, 3–6, 6–3.

References
 Results 

 
Tennis tournaments in Germany
ATP Tour World
ATP Finals
Tennis tournaments in South Africa
1992 in German tennis
Sports competitions in Frankfurt
1992 in South African tennis
Sports competitions in Johannesburg
ATP Tour World Championships
1990s in Frankfurt
1990s in Johannesburg